Make Your Mark: Ultimate Playlist is a 2012 compilation that was released on October 16, 2012. The album features musical artists associated with or popularized by Disney Channel like Bridgit Mendler, Debby Ryan, Ross Lynch, Zendaya, Bella Thorne, China Anne McClain, Luke Benward, Drew Ryan Scott and Olivia Holt singing their own soundtrack songs. Some songs were recorded prior to the production of this album, while others were recorded specifically for it.

Track listing

Charts

Release history

References

2012 compilation albums
Teen pop compilation albums
Pop rock compilation albums
Walt Disney Records compilation albums